Perrion Winfrey (born August 15, 2000) is an American football defensive tackle for the Cleveland Browns of the National Football League (NFL). He played college football at Iowa Western and Oklahoma.

Early life and high school career
Winfrey grew up in Maywood, Illinois, and attended Lake Park High School in Roselle, Illinois. Winfrey was rated a three-star prospect, but was not heavily recruited after failing to qualify academically to play NCAA Division I football.

College career
Winfrey began his collegiate career at Iowa Western Community College at the recommendation of coaches at Iowa State. Over two seasons he recorded 55 tackles with 23 tackles for loss and 9.5 sacks. Winfrey was rated the best Junior College prospect in the nation by 247Sports.com and committed to transfer to Oklahoma over offers from Alabama, Baylor, LSU, and Texas.

In his first year at Oklahoma Winfrey played in all 11 of the Sooners games and became a starter at defensive tackle. He was named second-team All-Big 12 Conference by the league's coaches after recording 19 tackles, six for loss, and three pass breakups. After the season Winfrey considered entering the 2021 NFL Draft, but opted to return to Oklahoma for his senior season.

Professional career

Winfrey was drafted by the Cleveland Browns with the 108th overall pick in the fourth round of the 2022 NFL Draft. Winfrey appeared in 13 games as a rookie. He had .5 sacks, 22 total tackles, and two passes defensed.

References

External links
 Cleveland Browns bio
Oklahoma Sooners bio
 Iowa Western Reivers bio

Living people
Players of American football from Illinois
Sportspeople from Maywood, Illinois
American football defensive tackles
Oklahoma Sooners football players
Iowa Western Reivers football players
2000 births
Cleveland Browns players